French submarine Bernoulli (Q83) was a Laubeuf type submarine of the Brumaire class, built for the French Navy prior to World War I.

Design and construction 
Bernoulli was ordered by the French Navy as part of its 1906 programme and was laid down at the Arsenal de Toulon in November of that year. Work progressed slowly, and she was not launched until 1 June 1911. She was commissioned on 29 October 1912. 
She was equipped with licence-built M.A.N. diesel engines for surface propulsion, and electric motors for power while submerged. She carried eight torpedoes, two internally and six externally.
Bernoulli was named for Daniel Bernoulli, the 18th century Swiss mathematician, and other members of the Bernoulli family.

Service history
On 30 November 1914, under the command of Lt. Defforges, Bernoulli attempted to penetrate the harbour at Cattaro. She was detected and forced to retire. 
On 28 April 1915 Bernoulli made another attempt on Cattaro. On this occasion she gained entrance, but found no targets and again had to retire. 
On 4 May 1916, now under the command of Lt. Rene Audry, Bernoulli sighted the Austrian destroyer SMS Csepel. She closed and attacked, scoring a torpedo hit on Csepel’s stern. Czepel was badly damaged, and thought to have sunk, but in fact gained port.  
On 15 May 1917, during the aftermath of the battle at the Otranto Barrage, Bernoulli encountered a group of Austrian destroyers running for home, and fired on Balaton. However this attack was unsuccessful and Balaton escaped. 
On 27 October 1917 Bernoulli sighted the German U-boat UC 38. She closed and attacked but was unable to score a hit; UC 38 escaped without damage.
Bernoulli’s final patrol was in February 1918, on close blockade duty off Cattaro. She was not heard from after 13 February 1918 and is believed to have struck a mine off Cattaro and sunk. All 23 of her crew were lost. Her commander, Rene Audry, was honoured by having a submarine named after him.

Notes

Notes

Bibliography

 Halpern, P: A Naval History of World War I (1994) 
 Moore, J: Jane’s Fighting Ships of World War I (1919, reprinted 2003)

External links
 Castel, Marc: Bernoulli at Sous-marins Français 1863 - pagesperso-orange.fr (French)
 Sieche, Erwin: French naval operations in the Adriatic at gwpda.org

1911 ships
Brumaire-class submarines
Lost submarines of France
Maritime incidents in 1918
Ships lost with all hands
World War I shipwrecks in the Adriatic Sea
Missing submarines
Ships built in France
World War I submarines of France